Anders Bjork may refer to:

Anders Björck (born 1944), Swedish politician
Anders Bjork (ice hockey) (born 1996), American ice hockey player